The Miss Wyoming USA competition is the pageant that selects the representative for the state Wyoming in the Miss USA pageant. It is currently produced by Future Productions based in Savage, Minnesota since 2005.

Wyoming has placed twice in Miss USA (in 1986 and 2010), won five Miss Congeniality awards, and earned one Miss Photogenic award.

Three Miss Wyoming USAs have won the Miss Wyoming Teen USA title and competed at Miss Teen USA, four have competed at Miss America and one has competed at Miss America's Outstanding Teen.

Morgan McNally of Casper was crowned Miss Wyoming USA 2022 on June 18, 2022 at John F. Welsh Auditorium on Natrona County High School in Casper. She represented Wyoming for the title of Miss USA 2022.

Gallery of titleholders

Results summary

Placements
Top 10: Beth King (1986)
Top 15: Claire Schreiner (2010)

Wyoming holds a record of just 2 placements at Miss USA.

Awards
Miss Congeniality: Linda Leafdale (1966), Pam Williams (1979), Cynthia Pate (2009), Mikaela Shaw (2017), Callie Bishop (2018)
Miss Photogenic: Beth King (1986)

Winners 

Color key

References

External links

Wyoming
Wyoming culture
Women in Wyoming
1952 establishments in Wyoming
Recurring events established in 1952